The Belle Vue Islands are a group of islands within the Torres Strait Islands, Queensland, Australia.

They include:

Aipus Island
Arden Island
Cap Islet
Florence Island
Iadi Island
Kamutnab Islet
Kaub Islets
Kongan Rock
Mabuiag Island, the only inhabited island in the group
Marte Island
Mipa Islet
North Island
Passage Island
Pelican Islet
Puigulag Islet
Pulu Islet
Pururai Islet
Red Fruit Island
Scott Island
Subur Islet
Warakuikul Talab Island
Widul Island

See also
List of Torres Strait Islands

References 

Torres Strait Islands